In the mathematical discipline of linear algebra, a matrix decomposition or matrix factorization is a factorization of a matrix into a product of matrices. There are many different matrix decompositions; each finds use among a particular class of problems.

Example 
In numerical analysis, different decompositions are used to implement efficient matrix algorithms.

For instance, when solving a system of linear equations , the matrix A can be decomposed via the LU decomposition. The LU decomposition factorizes a matrix into a lower triangular matrix L and an upper triangular matrix U. The systems  and  require fewer additions and multiplications to solve, compared with the original system , though one might require significantly more digits in inexact arithmetic such as floating point.

Similarly, the QR decomposition expresses A as QR with Q an orthogonal matrix and R an upper triangular matrix. The system Q(Rx) = b is solved by Rx = QTb = c, and the system Rx = c is solved by 'back substitution'.  The number of additions and multiplications required is about twice that of using the LU solver, but no more digits are required in inexact arithmetic because the QR decomposition is numerically stable.

Decompositions related to solving systems of linear equations

LU decomposition 

Traditionally applicable to: square matrix A, although rectangular matrices can be applicable.
Decomposition: , where L is lower triangular and U is upper triangular
Existence: An LUP decomposition exists for any square matrix A. When P is an identity matrix, the LUP decomposition reduces to the LU decomposition.
Comments: The LUP and LU decompositions are useful in solving an n-by-n system of linear equations . These decompositions summarize the process of Gaussian elimination in matrix form. Matrix P represents any row interchanges carried out in the process of Gaussian elimination. If Gaussian elimination produces the row echelon form without requiring any row interchanges, then P = I, so an LU decomposition exists.

LU reduction

Block LU decomposition

Rank factorization 

Applicable to: m-by-n matrix A of rank r
Decomposition:  where C is an m-by-r full column rank matrix and F is an r-by-n full row rank matrix
Comment: The rank factorization can be used to compute the Moore–Penrose pseudoinverse of A, which one can apply to obtain all solutions of the linear system .

Cholesky decomposition 

Applicable to: square, hermitian, positive definite matrix 
Decomposition: , where  is upper triangular with real positive diagonal entries
Uniqueness: for positive definite matrices Cholesky decomposition is unique. However, it is not unique in the positive semi-definite case.
Comment: if  is real and symmetric,  has all real elements
Comment: An alternative is the LDL decomposition, which can avoid extracting square roots.

QR decomposition 

Applicable to: m-by-n matrix A with linearly independent columns
Uniqueness: In general it is not unique, but if  is of full rank, then there exists a single  that has all positive diagonal elements. If  is square, also  is unique.
Comment: The QR decomposition provides an effective way to solve the system of equations .

RRQR factorization

Interpolative decomposition

Decompositions based on eigenvalues and related concepts

Eigendecomposition 

Also called spectral decomposition.
Applicable to: square matrix A with linearly independent eigenvectors (not necessarily distinct eigenvalues).
Decomposition: , where D is a diagonal matrix formed from the eigenvalues of A, and the columns of V are the corresponding eigenvectors of A.
Existence: An n-by-n matrix A always has n (complex) eigenvalues, which can be ordered (in more than one way) to form an n-by-n diagonal matrix D and a corresponding matrix of nonzero columns V that satisfies the eigenvalue equation .   is invertible if and only if the n eigenvectors are linearly independent (that is, each eigenvalue has geometric multiplicity equal to its algebraic multiplicity). A sufficient (but not necessary) condition for this to happen is that all the eigenvalues are different (in this case geometric and algebraic multiplicity are equal to 1)
Comment: One can always normalize the eigenvectors to have length one (see the definition of the eigenvalue equation)
In particular all unitary, Hermitian, or skew-Hermitian (in the real-valued case, all orthogonal, symmetric, or skew-symmetric, respectively) matrices are normal and therefore possess this property.
Comment: The eigendecomposition is useful for understanding the solution of a system of linear ordinary differential equations or linear difference equations. This is much easier to do and understand than raising A to power t, since A is usually not diagonal.

Jordan decomposition 
The Jordan normal form and the Jordan–Chevalley decomposition
Applicable to: square matrix A
Comment: the Jordan normal form generalizes the eigendecomposition to cases where there are repeated eigenvalues and cannot be diagonalized, the Jordan–Chevalley decomposition does this without choosing a basis.

Schur decomposition 

Applicable to: square matrix A
Decomposition (complex version): , where U is a unitary matrix,  is the conjugate transpose of U, and T is an upper triangular matrix called the complex Schur form which has the eigenvalues of A along its diagonal.
Comment: if A is a normal matrix, then T is diagonal and the Schur decomposition coincides with the spectral decomposition.

Real Schur decomposition 
Applicable to: square matrix A
Decomposition: This is a version of Schur decomposition where  and  only contain real numbers. One can always write  where V is a real orthogonal matrix,  is the transpose of V, and S is a block upper triangular matrix called the real Schur form. The blocks on the diagonal of S are of size 1×1 (in which case they represent real eigenvalues) or 2×2 (in which case they are derived from complex conjugate eigenvalue pairs).

QZ decomposition 

Also called: generalized Schur decomposition
Applicable to: square matrices A and B
Comment: there are two versions of this decomposition: complex and real.
Decomposition (complex version):  and  where Q and Z are unitary matrices, the * superscript represents conjugate transpose, and S and T are upper triangular matrices.
Comment: in the complex QZ decomposition, the ratios of the diagonal elements of S to the corresponding diagonal elements of T, are the generalized eigenvalues that solve the generalized eigenvalue problem  (where  is an unknown scalar and v is an unknown nonzero vector).
Decomposition (real version):  and  where A, B, Q, Z, S, and T are matrices containing real numbers only. In this case Q and Z are orthogonal matrices, the T superscript represents transposition, and S and T are block upper triangular matrices. The blocks on the diagonal of S and T are of size 1×1 or 2×2.

Takagi's factorization 
Applicable to: square, complex, symmetric matrix A.
Decomposition: , where D is a real nonnegative diagonal matrix, and V is unitary.  denotes the matrix transpose of V.
Comment: V may be complex even if A is real.
Moreover, if A is not real, it is not Hermitian and the form using  also does not apply.

Singular value decomposition 

Applicable to: m-by-n matrix A.
Decomposition: , where D is a nonnegative diagonal matrix, and U and V satisfy . Here  is the conjugate transpose of V (or simply the transpose, if V contains real numbers only), and I denotes the identity matrix (of some dimension). 
Comment: The diagonal elements of D are called the singular values of A.
Comment: Like the eigendecomposition above, the singular value decomposition involves finding basis directions along which matrix multiplication is equivalent to scalar multiplication, but it has greater generality since the matrix under consideration need not be square.

Scale-invariant decompositions 

Refers to variants of existing matrix decompositions, such as the SVD, that are invariant with respect to diagonal scaling.

Applicable to: m-by-n matrix A.
Unit-Scale-Invariant Singular-Value Decomposition: , where S is a unique nonnegative diagonal matrix of scale-invariant singular values,  U and V are unitary matrices,  is the conjugate transpose of V, and positive diagonal matrices D and E.
Comment: Is analogous to the SVD except that the diagonal elements of S are invariant with respect to left and/or right multiplication of A by arbitrary nonsingular diagonal matrices, as opposed to the standard SVD for which the singular values are invariant with respect to left and/or right multiplication of A by arbitrary unitary matrices.
Comment: Is an alternative to the standard SVD when invariance is required with respect to diagonal rather than unitary transformations of A.
Diagonal matrices D and E, and unitary U and V, are not necessarily unique in general.
Comment: U and V matrices are not the same as those from the SVD.

Analogous scale-invariant decompositions can be derived from other matrix decompositions; for example, to obtain scale-invariant eigenvalues.

Other decompositions

Polar decomposition 

Applicable to: any square complex matrix A.
If  is invertible, then  is unique.
Since the product of two unitary matrices is unitary, taking one can write  which is the singular value decomposition. Hence, the existence of the polar decomposition is equivalent to the existence of the singular value decomposition.

 Algebraic polar decomposition 
Applicable to: square, complex, non-singular matrix A.
Decomposition: , where Q is a complex orthogonal matrix and S is complex symmetric matrix.
Uniqueness: If  has no negative real eigenvalues, then the decomposition is unique.

 Mostow's decomposition 
 Applicable to: square, complex, non-singular matrix A.
 Decomposition: , where U is unitary, M is real anti-symmetric and S is real symmetric.

 Sinkhorn normal form 

Applicable to: square real matrix A with strictly positive elements.
Decomposition: , where S is doubly stochastic and D1 and D2 are real diagonal matrices with strictly positive elements.

 Sectoral decomposition 
Applicable to: square, complex matrix A with numerical range contained in the sector .

 Williamson's normal form 
 Applicable to: square, positive-definite real matrix A with order 2n×2n.
 Decomposition: , where  is a symplectic matrix and D is a nonnegative n-by-n diagonal matrix.

Matrix square root

 Decomposition: , not unique in general.
 In the case of positive semidefinite , there is a unique positive semidefinite  such that .

 Generalizations 

There exist analogues of the SVD, QR, LU and Cholesky factorizations for quasimatrices and cmatrices or continuous matrices'. A ‘quasimatrix’ is, like a matrix, a rectangular scheme whose elements are indexed, but one discrete index is replaced by a continuous index. Likewise, a ‘cmatrix’, is continuous in both indices. As an example of a cmatrix, one can think of the kernel of an integral operator.

For an account, and a translation to English of the seminal papers, see .

See also 
 Matrix splitting
 Non-negative matrix factorization
 Principal component analysis

References

Notes

Citations

Bibliography

External links 
Online Matrix Calculator
Wolfram Alpha Matrix Decomposition Computation » LU and QR Decomposition
Springer Encyclopaedia of Mathematics » Matrix factorization
GraphLab GraphLab collaborative filtering library, large scale parallel implementation of matrix decomposition methods (in C++) for multicore.

Matrix theory
 
factorization